Chevrolet Corvette Z06 refers to different models of the Chevrolet Corvette:
 Chevrolet Corvette C2 Z06 (1963)
 Chevrolet Corvette C5 Z06 (2001-2004)
 Chevrolet Corvette C6 Z06 (2006-2013)
 Chevrolet Corvette C7 Z06 (2014-2019)
 Chevrolet Corvette C8 Z06 (2023-)